Elena Altieri (born Elena Capucci; 27 July 1916 – 1 May 1997) was an Italian film and stage actress. She appeared in 27 films between 1937 and 1955. She was born in Stresa, the daughter of an Italian father and an English mother. She was mainly cast, both on stage and in films, in roles of haughty and aristocratic women.

Partial filmography

 Queen of the Scala (1937)
 Luciano Serra, Pilot (1938) - (uncredited)
 We Were Seven Sisters (1939) - Tina
 At Your Orders, Madame (1939) - Ginette
 Piccolo hotel (1939)
 In the Country Fell a Star (1939) - La cognata di Margaret
 L'amore si fa così (1939) - Una indossatrice
 Vento di milioni (1940)
 Big Shoes (1940) - Marta
 Idyll in Budapest (1941)
 Il pozzo dei miracoli (1941) - Anna
 Vertigine (1942) - Marcella
 Oro nero (1942) - La collega di Marta
 Guardia del corpo (1942)
 Colpi di timone (1942) - Jole Precordi, sua moglie
 Quarta pagina (1942) - Sua moglie
 The White Angel (1943) - Clara, moglie di Arnaldo
 La maschera e il volto (1943)
 Bicycle Thieves (1948) - The Charitable Lady
 Totò Le Mokò (1949) - Nancy
 His Last Twelve Hours (1950) - La contessa
 Romanzo d'amore (1950) - amie de Luisa
 Free Escape (1951)
 Altri tempi (1952) - Moglie del maggiore (segment "Pot-pourri di canzoni") (uncredited)
 The Golden Coach (1952) - Duchesse de Castro
 L'ultimo amante (1955) - La direttrice del giornale
 Scapricciatiello (1955) - The Baroness Matilde - Renato's mother
 Difendo il mio amore (1956)

References

External links

1916 births
1997 deaths
Italian film actresses
20th-century Italian actresses
Italian stage actresses
People from Stresa